Taste Buds is a Canadian children's television series, produced by (TVOntario) by partners/executive producers Mark Bishop and Matt Hornburg of Toronto's marblemedia. The series premiered on September 1, 2008 and ended on September 24, 2012 after three seasons. At the 2010 Gemini Awards, marblemedia accepted the company's first-ever Gemini, for Taste Buds season 2, in the category of "Best Cross-Platform Production – Children's and Youth". Taste Buds was shot at various locations in and around Toronto and Southern Ontario. Reruns were broadcast on the Qubo television network from June 30, 2012 (alongside Artzooka!, Jakers! The Adventures of Piggley Winks and Harry and His Bucket Full of Dinosaurs) to May 24, 2020.

Taste Buds is a cooking show geared to children aged 7–10, that teaches children to think about what they eat and explore new foods from around the world. The two young hosts, Avery and Lily, cook recipes that are easy for kids to make by themselves or with a bit of grown up help. The episodes follow Avery and Lily as they lead viewers on new taste adventures exploring the culture, history, science and art behind different foods. Also helping out in the kitchen is their adult co-host Matt, a chef and fellow Taste Bud who is passionate about food and eager to share his expert knowledge. It also stars other kids that help out and try foods on every episode.

The show also contains the high-tech Chillbot 3000, a voice-activated computer fridge that outputs recipes, facts and tips in a flash. Chillbot also connects the Taste Buds to one of four field correspondents: Health Meister, Science Whiz, World Traveller and History Buff, each providing the hosts with background educational information on the food they are working with.

Hosts

Avery
Avery (Avery Bilz) believes that food is fun, so his cooking tends to follow his intuition instead of a recipe. When baking cookies, he will go with the flow and add mini-marshmallows to the dough if he feels like it. He is always willing to try a new taste sensation—especially if his co-host Lily "eggs" him

Matt
Matt (Matt Austin) is the fun and quirky grown-up in the group. He acts as a mentor for Lily and Avery. Like Lily and Avery, Matt loves to cook. He is a natural. He creates different cooking challenges for them. He usually judges the dishes that they make. He didn't appear in Season 3.

Lily

Jasmine
To "spice up" this cooking show, young, rising star, Jasmine is thrust into the mix for six episodes, and quickly sizzled her way to the top. With an unprecedented palate for fine foods, Jasmine splashed onto the scene in "Foods that Zing", and soon rose to stardom, appearing in five more episodes, "Foods That Are Colourful", "Foods for Kings and Queens", "Foods That Roll", "Foods That Are Stacked", and "Foods for a Party". Critics of the show raved of this jubilant and gregarious soul, who continues to have a strong foothold in the rise of pre-teen culinary television. Jasmine was played by Danielle Himelfarb. She is in episode 14 appeared in Season 1.

Awards

Episodes

Season 1 (13 episodes, 2008, 2 episodes, 2009)
 "Foods That Smell"
 "Foods That Melt"
 "Foods That Grow"
 "Foods That Stick"
 "Foods That Fuel"
 "Foods That Crunch"
 "Foods That Are Flat"
 "Foods That Are Sweet"
 "Foods That Are Purple"
 "Foods That Sizzle"
 "Foods That Rise"
 "Foods That Stretch"
 "Foods That Crack"
 "Meet the new friends!"
 "Lily and Avery's Cooking Party"

Season 2
 "Foods That Make You Smile"
 "Foods That Are Ooey-Gooey"
 "Foods That Make You Pucker"
 "Foods That Ooze"
 "Foods That Are Fancy"
 "Foods That Are Hot"
 "Foods That Flow"
 "Foods That Are Super-Powerful"
 "Foods That Start with 'Q'"
 "Foods That Are Wrapped"
 "Foods for the Brain"
 "Foods That Are Raw"
 "Foods for Dudes"
 "Taste Buds The Movie"
 "Let's all cook!"

Season 3 (10 episodes, 2011, 5 episodes, 2012)
 "Foods That Zing"
 "Foods That Are Stacked"
 "Foods That Roll"
 "Foods for Kings and Queens"
 "Foods That Are Colourful"
 "Foods for a Party"
 "Foods That Are Healthy"
 "Foods That Are Spicy "
 "Foods in Ohio"
 "Foods That Are Pretty"
 "Sensational Sandwiches"
 "The Taste Buds World Tour"
 "Crazy for Cheese"
 "Matt is back!"
 "The Food Games"

References

External links
 
 
 Press release about the show
 CFTPA nomination

2008 Canadian television series debuts
2010 Canadian television series endings
TVO original programming
2000s Canadian children's television series
2010s Canadian children's television series
2000s Canadian cooking television series
2010s Canadian cooking television series
Television series about children